Christensen Glacier may refer to:
 Christensen Glacier (Bouvet Island)
 Christensen Glacier (South Georgia)

See also
 Christiaensen Glacier